Vladimír Sičák is a Czech ice hockey defenceman who currently plays professionally in Finland for Oulun Kärpät of the SM-liiga.

References

External links

Czech expatriate ice hockey players in Finland
Living people
Oulun Kärpät players
1980 births
Czech ice hockey defencemen
Czech expatriate ice hockey players in the United States
Czech expatriate ice hockey players in Canada
Czech expatriate ice hockey players in Sweden